Sabour is a Union Council of Gujrat District, Punjab province, Pakistan. Sabour may also refer to:

Sabour Bradley (f. 2010s), Australian filmmaker, writer and broadcaster
Salah Abdel Sabour (1931–1981), Egyptian free verse poet, editor, playwright and essayist
Sabour., taxonomic author abbreviation of Raymond Sabouraud (1864–1938), French physician